Choi Yoon-yeol (born 17 April 1974) is a South Korean former football player.

Born in Andong, South Korea, he started his professional football career at Chunnam Dragons and played for the Anyang LG Cheetahs, Pohang Steelers, and Daejeon Citizen. Before the 2008 season, he retired from professional football. In 2010, he moved to Cheongju Jikji FC as an amateur footballer.

He played for the South Korea national football team and was a participant at the 1996 Summer Olympics and 1998 Asian Games.

Club career statistics

References

External links
 
 National Team Player Record 
 FIFA Player Statistics
 

1974 births
Living people
Association football defenders
South Korean footballers
South Korea under-23 international footballers
South Korea international footballers
FC Seoul players
Jeonnam Dragons players
Pohang Steelers players
Daejeon Hana Citizen FC players
K League 1 players
Footballers at the 1996 Summer Olympics
Olympic footballers of South Korea
Footballers at the 1998 Asian Games
Asian Games competitors for South Korea
Sportspeople from North Gyeongsang Province